is a song written and recorded by Japanese-American singer-songwriter Ai. Originally released digitally on November 18, 2011 as the second single from Ai's ninth studio album, Independent, it was released physically on December 14, 2011, by EMI Music Japan alongside "Letter in the Sky". 

Used as a commercial theme song for Coca-Cola's Christmas campaign in Japan from 2011 to 2015, "Happiness" became one of Ai's best performing singles in the 2010's to date with 3 million digital downloads. In 2013, the single received a Platinum certification from the Recording Industry Association of Japan (RIAJ).

Background and release 
In October 2011, "Letter in the Sky" was released digitally as the lead single for Independent. With the release, it was announced the song would be released physically in December.

"Happiness" originally was released to Chaka-Uta, a digital transmission technology in Japan used to distribute ringtones and songs to Japanese mobile phones in November 2011. It later was released to other digital stores. On December 14, "Happiness" was released physically with "Letter in the Sky" as a double A-side single.

Music videos 
Three music videos were made for "Happiness" and its remixes. The original music video was released in December 2011. In the video, Ai portrays a janitor, a high school principal, and a salesman driving a Coca-Cola delivery truck. The video switches between the three characters she portrays. At the end of the music video, Ai is seen performing the song as herself with the students of the school.

In 2012, a music video for the "Smile Version" of "Happiness" was released. The music video was shot in Yokohama.

In 2013, a music video for the "Giving Version" of "Happiness" was released.

Commercial performance 
The physical release of "Happiness / Letter in the Sky" debuted at number 14 on the Oricon weekly singles chart. On the Billboard Japan charts, "Happiness" debuted at number 4 and peaked at number 2 on the Japan Hot 100. The physical single peaked at number 13 on the Top Singles Sales chart. "Happiness" appeared in many year-end rankings.

Track listing 
All tracks written and produced by Ai Uemura unless noted. All tracks produced by Uta unless noted.

Charts

Weekly charts

Year-end charts

Credits and personnel 
Credits adapted from Tidal.

Original version 

 Ai Uemura – vocals, songwriter, producer
 Uta – producer, programming, recording arranger

English version 

 Ai Uemura – vocals, songwriter, producer
 Uta – producer, programming, recording arranger
 Latisha Hyman – songwriter

Reggae Summer remix 

 Ai Uemura – vocals, songwriter, producer
 Uta – producer, programming, recording arranger
 Mighty Crown – arranger, work arranger
 Danny Bassic – bass (vocals)
 Kirk Drummie – drums
 Monti – guitar
 Deen Fraser – horn
 Devon – keyboards
 Sami-T – programming, recording arranger

Certifications

Release history

Happiness (Gospel Version) 

On October 30, 2019, Ai released a gospel version of "Happiness" as promotional single from her 2019 compilation album, Kansha!!!! - Thank You for 20 Years New and Best.

Background 
To celebrate her twenty-year anniversary in the music industry and the then upcoming 2020 Summer Olympics, Ai traveled to Los Angeles, California to record new material, which later was revealed to be It's All Me, Vol. 1 (2020) and It's All Me, Vol. 2 (2021). While recording new material, Ai recorded gospel arrangements of her previously released hit singles.

Release history

Eito version 
Japanese musician Eito covered "Happiness" for the Coca-Cola winter 2020 campaign. His cover was released on November 11, 2020, by A.S.A.B. His cover was included as a bonus track on his debut studio album, Sukkarakan.

Live performances 
Eito performed the song live with Ai at the "Coca-Cola" Ribbon Bottle Happiness Night on December 10, 2020.

Release history

Footnotes

References 

2011 singles
2011 songs
Ai (singer) songs
EMI Music Japan singles
Japanese Christmas songs
Songs written by Ai (singer)
Song recordings produced by Ai (singer)
Songs about the 2011 Tōhoku earthquake and tsunami
Coca-Cola in popular culture